The 2011 Kobalt Tools 400 was a NASCAR Sprint Cup Series stock car race that was held on March 6, 2011 at Las Vegas Motor Speedway in Clark County, Nevada. Contested over 267 laps, it was the third race of the 2011 season. Carl Edwards, driving for Roush Fenway Racing, won the race. Tony Stewart finished second and Juan Pablo Montoya finished third.

Polesitter Matt Kenseth maintained his lead on the first lap to begin the race, as Greg Biffle, who started in the fourth position on the grid, remained behind him. On the 8th lap, the first caution was given because Robby Gordon spun sideways. Following the second caution, Stewart became the leader, and increased his lead to 6.5 seconds by lap 95. Late in the race, Stewart was given a penalty for speeding on pit road, giving the lead to Edwards. Edwards remained the leader to win for the second time at Las Vegas Motor Speedway.

There were seven cautions and 22 lead changes among 15 different drivers throughout the course of the race. It was Edwards' first win in the 2011 season and the 20th of his career. The result moved Edwards up to the third position in the Drivers' Championship, seven points behind Stewart while being tied with Montoya. Ford maintained its lead in the Manufacturers' Championship, three points ahead of Chevrolet and five ahead of Toyota, with 33 races remaining in the season. A total of 152,000 people attended the race, while 10.1 million watched it on television.

Report

Background

Las Vegas Motor Speedway is one of ten intermediate tracks to hold NASCAR races. The track's turns are banked  at 20 degrees, while the front stretch, the location of the finish line, and the back stretch on the opposite side of the track are banked at nine degrees. The racetrack has seats for 142,000 spectators.

Before the race, Kyle Busch was leading the Drivers' Championship with 80 points, and Kurt Busch stood in second with 77 points. Tony Stewart and A. J. Allmendinger followed tied for third and fourth with 69 points, four ahead of Jeff Gordon and Mark Martin, who were tied for fifth. In the Manufacturers' Championship, Ford, Toyota and Chevrolet were leading with twelve points, four points ahead of Dodge. Jimmie Johnson was the race's defending winner from 2010.

Practice and qualifying

Two practice sessions were held in preparation for the race; one on Friday and the other on Saturday. The first session lasted 90 minutes long, while the second was 75 minutes long. Matt Kenseth was quickest with a time of 28.939 seconds in the first session, 0.047 seconds faster than David Ragan. Montoya was just off Ragan's pace, followed by Carl Edwards, Greg Biffle, and Marcos Ambrose. Stewart was seventh, still within a second of Kenseth's time. Also in the first practice session, Jeff Gordon spun sideways after the fourth turn.

Forty-four cars were entered for qualifying; however, only forty-three could qualify for the race because of NASCAR's qualifying procedure. Kenseth clinched the fifth pole position of his career, with a time of 28.589 seconds. He was joined on the front row of the grid by Ambrose. Edwards qualified third, Biffle took fourth, and Kyle Busch started fifth. Joey Logano, Allmendinger, Newman, Martin Truex Jr. and Martin rounded out the top ten. The only driver that failed to qualify for the race was Brian Keselowski. Once the qualifying session completed, Kenseth commented, "Qualifying is not my strong suit, but I knew we had a really fast car today when we did our last qualifying run [in practice]. Honestly, this is the most nervous I've been before qualifying in probably five years at least, because I knew we had a shot at the pole, and I knew last week we really messed up. I didn't want to mess up a fast car today, so I was really happy with that."

In the second and final practice, Kenseth remained quickest with a time of 29.330 seconds. Kyle Busch followed in second, ahead of Newman and Edwards. Biffle was fifth quickest, with a time of 29.393 seconds. David Reutimann, Truex, Stewart, Logano, and Denny Hamlin rounded out the top ten positions. Ragan, who was second in the first session, could only manage 12th.

Race
The race, the third in the season, began at 3:00 p.m. EST and was televised live in the United States on Fox. Las Vegas Motor Speedway Chaplain Joe Freiburger began pre-race ceremonies, by giving the invocation. Next, Kristen Hertzenberg, from Phantom-Las Vegas Spectacular, performed the national anthem, and Gray Abercrombie, Lowe's sports marketing manager, gave the command for drivers to start their engines. During the pace laps, Hamlin had to move to the rear of the grid because of him changing his engine.

Kenseth retained his pole position lead into the first corner, followed by Biffle, who started fourth. Over the following two laps, Edwards fell to the fourth position, while Biffle passed Kenseth for the lead. After starting 16th on the grid, Trevor Bayne moved up to 11th by the fifth lap. On the following lap, Truex fell three positions to ninth. At lap eight, the first caution was given after Robby Gordon spun sideways. Most of the front runners made pit stops during the caution, while Jeff Gordon stayed out to become the leader. During the lap 12 restart, Jeff Gordon was the leader ahead of Stewart and Montoya. However, Stewart passed Gordon to become the leader on the next lap. Also on the same lap, Kenseth drove to pit road after having a flat tire. On the 14th lap, Stewart remained the leader, while Kurt Busch moved to the second position ahead of Jeff Gordon. Afterward, Andy Lally spun sideways, prompting the second caution. Few drivers made pit stops during the caution. At the lap 18 restart, Stewart was first, followed by Busch, Gordon, and Montoya. By the 20th lap, Reutimann, who started 25th on the grid, had moved up 18 positions.

By lap 24, Stewart maintained a 1.7 second lead over Busch, as Gordon fell to sixth. Stewart continued to increase his lead over the next ten laps, while Busch remained in the second position. On the 35th lap, Reutimann moved up to the sixth position. Seven laps later, Jamie McMurray and Keselowski made contact with each other. On the following lap, Paul Menard moved up to 12th. At the 45th lap, Stewart had a 3.6 second lead over Busch, as Johnson fell to 23rd. On the next lap, Biffle claimed second away from Busch. During lap 49, green flag pit stops began with Kurt Busch and Reutimann. On lap 51, Gordon, Montoya, made pit stops, as Biffle became the leader. Once green flag pit stops concluded on lap 62, Stewart reclaimed the first position ahead of Kyle Busch. Two laps later, Biffle claimed moved up to the fourth position. On the next lap, Bill Elliott claimed the fifth position. Stewart increased his lead to 1.6 seconds by the 67th lap. At lap 74, Gordon moved up into the tenth position after passing Logano. Four laps later, Kevin Harvick moved up to the 14th position. On lap 81, Harvick claimed the 13th position.

During lap 87, Gordon moved up to the tenth position. By the 95th lap, Stewart had increased his lead to 6.5 seconds over second place. On the next lap, the third caution was given after Kyle Busch collided into the wall because of a flat tire. Most of the frontrunners made pit stops during the caution. At the 101 restart, Stewart was the leader. On the following lap, Kurt Busch and Kahne spun sideways, prompting the fourth caution to be given. On the lap 106 restart, Stewart remained the leader ahead of Edwards and Biffle in second and third. On the 107th lap, Biffle passed Edwards for the second position. Afterward, Kyle Busch's engine failed, causing the fifth caution to come out. At lap 115, Stewart led Biffle on the restart. During lap 121, Edwards passed Biffle to claim second, as Stewart increased his lead. Ten laps later, Harvick moved up to the sixth position. On lap 138, Dale Earnhardt Jr. claimed the seventh position, while Truex fell to sixth. Eleven laps later, the sixth caution was given because Gilliland collided into the wall after having a flat tire. During the caution, most of the teams made pit stops. Also on the same lap, Stewart and Harvick received a penalty after having speeding on pit road.

At the lap 156 restart, Edwards became the leader ahead of Truex. Edwards maintained the lead on the next lap, as Montoya moved up into third. By lap 159, Edwards had a 1.25 second lead over Truex. Five laps later, Johnson passed Gordon for the ninth position. Edwards continued to increase his lead to 2.6 seconds by lap 171. After having a speed penalty, Stewart had moved up to 18th by the 178th lap. On lap 185, Clint Bowyer moved up to 16th, while Edwards increased his lead to 2.9 seconds. Nine laps later, the seventh caution was given after Gordon collided into the wall after having a flat tire. Most of the drivers made pit stops during the caution, as Stewart reclaimed the first position at the lap 202 restart. By the 214th lap, Stewart had a lead of 2.45 seconds. Four laps later, Menard moved up to the tenth position after passing Brian Vickers. On lap 220, Edwards passed Truex to claim third, as Stewart increased his lead to 3 seconds. Five laps later, Hamlin moved up to the seventh position. On lap 234, green flag pit stops began with Stewart and Montoya. Two laps later, Harvick and Johnson made pit stops, five laps before Edwards and Truex.

Once the green flag pit stops concluded, Edwards was the leader, 1.1 seconds ahead of Montoya. By the 250th lap, Edwards increased his lead to 1.6 seconds. On the following lap, Kurt Busch moved into the tenth position, as Newman moved up to fifth. With four laps remaining, Stewart passed Montoya for the second position.  Edwards maintained the lead to win his first race of the 2011 season. Stewart finished second, ahead of Montoya in third and Ambrose in fourth. Newman clinched the fifth position, after starting eighth.

Post-race

Edwards appeared in victory lane after his victory lap to start celebrating his first win of the season, in front of a crowd of 152,000 people. "These guys are unbelievable. It means a lot coming off Phoenix. I went home last week and didn’t know how things were going to go. You don’t get a good race car like that often. We had another one today," said Edwards of his triumph.

Although Stewart was leading the race near the end, Edwards passed him after the final pit stops. Stewart, who finished second, said, "I don't know what happened on the pit stop there, but we had a miscue and had a penalty and had to go to the back, and unfortunately it kind of dealt our cards for us. [Crew chief] Darian Grubb made a good call getting us the track position back, but it also showed everybody else that they could do it, too, and we couldn't run two-and-a-half runs on a set of left-side tires." In the subsequent press conference, Kyle Busch stated his frustration from his accident, "On the restart there [on Lap 107], I was going to bide my time and try to get back through traffic with plenty of time to go, and 'kablooey' – it just broke." Doug Yates, the engine builder for Roush Fenway Racing, expressed his enjoyment of winning the race:

Stewart also commented, "It kills me to throw a race away like that, especially at a place we haven't won at yet. This was a big deal [Sunday], and when you lead that many laps and have a car that's that fast and you lose it ... I'm sure [Monday] when the emotion dies down we'll look back and say it was a great weekend. But, man, it does not sit good right now." The race result moved Stewart into the first position in the Driver's Championship with 113 points, tied with Kurt Busch in second. Edwards, the winner of the race, and Montoya followed in third and fourth on 106, three points ahead of Newman in fifth. Ford maintained their lead in the Manufacturers' Championship with 21 points. Chevrolet and Toyota placed second and third with 18 and 16 points, while Dodge was fourth with 11. 10.1 million people watched the race on television. The race took two hours, fifty-seven minutes and twenty seconds to complete, and the margin of victory was 1.246 seconds.

Carl's win would be the only win of the season for him, in the same race teammate Matt Kenseth won en route to the 2003 title.  Due to the Chase format introduced after Matt's title, Carl would end up losing the title via tiebreaker to Stewart, who entered the Chase winless and went on to win five of the ten Chase races, including the finale.

Results

Qualifying

Race results

Standings after the race

Drivers' Championship standings

Manufacturers' Championship standings

Note: Only the top five positions are included for the driver standings.

References

Kobalt Tools 400
Kobalt Tools 400
NASCAR races at Las Vegas Motor Speedway
Kobalt Tools 400